Caitlín Maude (22 May 1941 – 6 June 1982) was an Irish poet, activist, teacher, actress and traditional singer.

Early life
She was born in Casla, County Galway, and reared in the Irish language. Her mother, Máire Nic an Iomaire, was a school teacher from Ballyfinglas, and Caitlín received her primary education from her on a small island off the coast of Rosmuc, Connemara. Caitlín's father, John Maude, was from Cill Bhriocáin in Rosmuc.

Caitlín Maude attended University College Galway, where she excelled in French. She became a teacher, working in schools in Counties Kildare, Mayo, and Wicklow. She also worked in other capacities in London and Dublin.

Career
She was widely known as an actor. She acted at the University, at An Taibhdhearc in Galway and the Damer Theatre in Dublin, and was particularly successful in a production of An Triail by Máiréad Ní Ghráda at the Damer Theatre in 1964, in which she played the protagonist of the story, Máire Ní Chathasaigh. She herself was a playwright and co-authored An Lasair Choille with poet Michael Hartnett.

She began writing poetry in Irish in secondary school and developed a lyrical style closely attuned to the rhythms of the voice. Though not conventionally religious, she said in an interview that she had a deep interest in the spiritual and that this would leave its mark on her poetry. She was noted as a highly effective reciter of her own verse. Géibheann is the best-known of her poems, and is studied at Leaving Certificate Higher Level Irish in the Republic of Ireland. A posthumous collected edition, Caitlín Maude, Dánta, was published in 1984, Caitlín Maude: file in 1985 in Ireland and Italy, and Coiscéim in 1985.

As a member of the Dublin Irish-speaking community she was active in many campaigns, including the establishment of the Gaelscoil (Irish-medium primary school) Scoil Santain in Tallaght, County Dublin.

She was a sean-nós singer of distinction. She made one album in this genre, Caitlín (released in 1975 on Gael Linn Records), now available as a CD. It contains both traditional songs and a selection of her poetry.

Personal life
She married Cathal Ó Luain in 1969. They had one child Caomhán, their son.

Death
She died of complications from cancer in 1982 aged 41, and is buried in Bohernabreena graveyard overlooking the city on the Dublin Mountains.

In 2001, a new writers' centre in Galway was named after her: Ionad Schribhneoiri Chaitlin Maude, Gaillimh.

References

Sources
 Ó Coigligh, Ciarán (ed.) (1984). Caitlín Maude: dánta. Coiscéim.
 Caitlín Maude - Caitlín [CD]. Ref: CEFCD042

External links
 
 
 

1941 births
1982 deaths
20th-century Irish actresses
20th-century Irish-language poets
20th-century Irish women singers
20th-century Irish women writers
Actresses from County Galway
Alumni of the University of Galway
Irish-language writers
Irish schoolteachers
Irish stage actresses
Irish women poets
Musicians from County Galway
Sean-nós singers